Maposua is both a surname and a given name. Notable people with the name include:

Iosefa Maposua (born 1977), Samoan footballer
Uati Maposua (born 1976), Samoan weightlifter
Maposua Rudolf Keil (died 2018), Samoan businessman